The Chantal Range is a range of mountains in far North-eastern Russia. Administratively the range is part of the Chukotka Autonomous Okrug of the Russian Federation. The area of the range is desolate and uninhabited.

Geography
The Chantal Range is located in the central area of the Chukotka Mountains, part of the East Siberian System of ranges. 
This mountain chain runs in a roughly WSW/ENE direction for about 100 km. It is limited to the west by the bank of the Chantalveergyn River, beyond which rises the Ekiatap Range; to the north it borders with the Palyavaam range, and to the south with the Ekityk Range. The highest point of the range is Iskhodnaya peak, reaching  —or  according to other sources. This summit is also the highest point of the Chukotka Mountains.

See also
List of mountains and hills of Russia

References

Landforms of Siberia
Chukotka Mountains